This is a list of prefects of Vukovar-Srijem County.

Prefects of Vukovar-Srijem County (1993–present)

See also
Vukovar-Syrmia County

Notes

External links
World Statesmen - Vukovar-Srijem County

Vukovar-Syrmia County